The Journal of Commercial Biotechnology is a peer-reviewed academic journal covering the business of biotechnology. Topics covered include biotechnology management, policy, finance, law, and regulations.

The Journal of Commercial Biotechnology was founded by Henry Stewart Publications in 1992 as the Journal of Biotechnology in Healthcare, and changed its name to the Journal of Commercial Biotechnology in 1998. The journal was later published by Palgrave MacMillan and was purchased by thinkBiotech in 2010. It is published quarterly. An external Editorial Board assists with peer review. The current editor of the Journal of Commercial Biotechnology is Yali Friedman, who has served since 2007.

References

External links
Journal of Commercial Biotechnology website

Biotechnology journals
Business and management journals
Quarterly journals
English-language journals